Gennep is a municipality and a city in upper southeastern Netherlands. It lies in the very northern part of the province of Limburg, 18 km south of Nijmegen. Furthermore, it lies on the right bank of the Meuse river, and south of the forest of the Klever Reichswald. The municipality of Gennep has 17,277 inhabitants (2014).

The Niers river flows into the Meuse in Gennep.

Population centres

The city of Gennep 

Gennep was the title of a comital family, known descendants of which are the famous Saint Norbert of Gennep and William of Gennep, Archbishop-Elector of Cologne.

Gennep probably received city rights in 1371. However, it remains unclear whether these city rights have really been assigned to Gennep, as the supposed documents burned during a fire in the townhall of Gennep at the end of the 16th century. 

In 2001, Gennep had 8306 inhabitants.

International relations

Twin towns — Sister cities
Gennep is twinned with:

Notable people 
 Marcel van Grunsven (1896 in Gennep - 1969) Mayor of Heerlen from 1926 to 1961
 Theo Blankenaauw (1923 in Gennep – 2011) a Dutch track cyclist, competed at the 1948 Summer Olympics
 Vincent Van Gogh painted three oils of the water mill at Gennep

Gallery

References

External links 

 

 
Populated places in Limburg (Netherlands)
Municipalities of Limburg (Netherlands)